Owen Brenman (born 17 December 1956, in London) is an English actor best known for his role as next-door neighbour Nick Swainey in the multi-award-winning BBC sitcom One Foot in the Grave, which ran for ten years (1990–2000) and was written by David Renwick. He subsequently played Heston Carter in the BBC drama series Doctors from 2008 to 2018.

Education
Brenman was educated at University College School, an independent day school for boys in Hampstead in north west London, followed by the University of Birmingham, where he obtained a BA Honours in Drama, and the Webber Douglas School of Singing and Dramatic Art, now known as the Webber Douglas Academy of Dramatic Art.

Career
In addition to One Foot in the Grave Brenman also played Lloyd Drewitt in two series of David Renwick's BBC dramedy Love Soup (2005/8). He also starred in People Like Us, three series of the children's television series Woof!, and three series of Alexei Sayle's Stuff. He played Mark Thatcher opposite John Wells and Angela Thorne in the political sitcom Dunrulin'''.

On the London stage Brenman played Theo in the 2006 European premiere of Steve Martin's The Underpants at the Old Red Lion Theatre - a reworking of Carl Sternheim's 1911 satirical comedy, Die Hose. Brenman also played Ian in the football comedy An Evening with Gary Lineker at the Duchess Theatre, and Tariq Ali's and Howard Brenton's New Labour satire Ugly Rumours (Tricycle Theatre), The Ghost Train (Lyric Hammersmith Theatre), C4 Sitcom Festival (Riverside Theatre) which resulted in the C4 comedy series In Exile and a rarely performed Ionesco play, Journeys Among The Dead (Riverside Theatre).

Outside London, Brenman played Felix in Elly Brewer's and Sandi Toksvig’s Shakespeare deconstruction The Pocket Dream (York Theatre Royal), Brian in Terry Johnson's Dead Funny (Nottingham Playhouse), toured with Butterflies Are Free, appeared in The Winslow Boy and The Trial of Lady Chatterley (Nottingham Playhouse) and Richard Hope's black comedy about serial killers and the press, Good Copy, in which he played a paedophile priest opposite Robert Bathurst's prostitute murderer (West Yorkshire Playhouse).

In 2008, Brenman completed a UK tour, with Richard Wilson, of Steve Thompson’s political comedy Whipping It Up  and featured in a new series of Doctor Who for BBC Radio 7. He played Heston Carter in BBC television series Doctors'' from 2008 to 2018.

He was nominated for Best Actor at the 2010, 2011 and 2016 British Soap Awards.

Filmography

Films

TV

References

External links

Official Site

1956 births
Living people
Alumni of the University of Birmingham
Alumni of the Webber Douglas Academy of Dramatic Art
English male television actors
English male stage actors
Male actors from London
People educated at University College School